Nicholas John Townsend (born 12 September 1975), known professionally as Nick J Townsend, is an English musician, magazine columnist, TV extra and illustrator. He is best known as the founder, lead singer and guitarist of British band Weak13, and for having half of his hair and beard shaved off, a trait maintained throughout his adult life.

Early life
Townsend was born in Kidderminster, Worcestershire with a defect on his head. He underwent surgery on his skull at the age of 13. One year after a successful operation Nick became drawn to art, he began an interest in playing the guitar the following year. Townsend developed anxiety problems post-surgery and later shaved off half of his hair in Amsterdam in 1996.

College years
In 2001 Nick attended a part-time music management course at Kidderminster College and was a driving force in assisting lecturer Kevyn Gammond Band of Joy in setting up and recruiting bands for a college record label called Mighty Atom Smasher. Gammond's idea was originally an in-lesson hypothetical label of which Townsend suggested should shorten its name to M.A.S. Records.

Whilst a freshman at the college Nick created a student magazine there which he alongside fellow musician King Rich became co-editor of and named it P.M.T. (Promotional Marketing Tool). It was designed to help advertise and promote the artists on the college record label founded by Kevyn Gammond. Originally it was suggested by Gammond that it be named M.A.S. Magazine but Townsend and King decided on PMT. The printed free magazine ran for only 6 issues (2002–2005) and mainly contained articles on independent bands or songwriters plus satirical and controversial material; a total of 5000 printed copies were published for each edition. The magazine provided positive media attention for the college and the record label. Nick left College in 2003 but continued the magazine and returned to help the College record label on a voluntary basis.

Townsend on 3 February 2004 met HRH Prince Edward by royal appointment and spoke to the Earl of Wessex on behalf of the college record label that Robert Plant of English rock band Led Zeppelin had been made patron of. One newspaper reported "...tattooed rocker Nick Townsend, who was helping out at MAS during the royal visit, said the prince had been pleased to hear the young bands would be raising cash for Kidderminster War Memorial with a rock festival". Nick was quoted about the royal visit "He was quite flabbergasted by my image – but seemed very interested in MAS and was asking about the bands and the war memorial gig".

The concert mentioned by the Prince during his visit was a rock festival called Disobey filled with artists from the college record label and was held at Kidderminster Town Hall which Townsend and King had negotiated and organised for the then mayor of Kidderminster Ken Stokes to raise money for the town's War Memorial along with successfully bringing back live music to the Town Hall building. The landmark event created by Mayor Stokes, Townsend and King revitalised interest and potential for the venue which hadn't accommodated live music in over 20 years and beforehand had housed world-famous rock acts including The Rolling Stones, U2 and The Who. The Disobey rock concert took place on 13 March 2004 and attracted the attention of Californian Skate and Surf ware company Vans who offered a sponsorship deal.

In 2003 he received an award by the town newspaper The Shuttle in recognition for his work in helping create and set up Kidderminster college's own record label M.A.S. Records.

Music career
Born in Kidderminster, United Kingdom, Townsend musically began his career playing guitar in small pub bands in the late 1990s. In 1999, exactly thirteen weeks before the millennium, he formed his first original band called Weak13. He started running regular rock themed events after a wine bar in Kidderminster, known at the time as Redwoods, offered him their venue for a fund raising show after his band Weak13 had £1000 of music equipment stolen. Nick acquired a reputation with his style of songwriting, singing and guitar work in the band which has been quoted as "...one of the biggest names in British underground music". Townsend co-wrote the band's debut studio album titled They Live with musicians Wesley Smith and Neel Parmar.

Magazines and music journalism
Townsend is an active advocate of independent music, supporting the careers of many musicians, bands and songwriters, particularly those from within Worcestershire, Birmingham and The Black Country. In 2002 he set up an independent music magazine known as PMT (Promotional Marketing Tool) which would often include satirical editorial content and articles on bands that featured on rock events organised by him.  In 2008 he stopped producing his own self-published magazines and became a writer for Ryan's Gig Guide and replaced then guest columnist Emma Scott of Kerrang Radio. In 2013 he became head of features for Ryan's Gig Guide.

In 2017, Townsend became a guest journalist for independent news station We Humans.

Illustration work
Nick has illustrated for several authors including Droitwich children's book author Louise E. Lench creating the initial look of the characters for her book series Flo And Teddy and Walsall based teen horror writer Lucy Onions, Nick designed the cover art for her book titled Shout The Call.

TV and film
In 2014 when Townsend performed his debut lead acting role in the American short film Chasing. The production was filmed in Los Angeles and directed by James Craigmiles. The song "Joke" by his band Weak13 appeared within the soundtrack of the film. In 2015 Nick directed a satirical entertainment documentary in Los Angeles titled Clingfilm. The documentary contains interviews with LA based musicians and actors working in the entertainment industry, including cast members of McFarland, USA and I Am Legend.

References

External links
 
 

1975 births
English punk rock guitarists
English male singer-songwriters
Musicians from the West Midlands (county)
Post-grunge musicians
Living people
21st-century English singers
21st-century British guitarists
British hard rock musicians
21st-century British male singers